Strzemeszno  is a village in the administrative district of Gmina Gąbin, within Płock County, Masovian Voivodeship, in east-central Poland.

The village has a population of 157.

History
Strzemeszno was a private village of Polish nobility, administravely located in the Rawa Voivodeship in the Greater Poland Province of the Polish Crown.

During the German occupation (World War II), the Germans murdered several Polish farmers from Strzemeszno in two massacres committed in the forests near Gąbin in 1939, and in October 1940 several Polish families were expelled and deported to forced labour to Germany, while their farms were handed over to German colonists as part of the Lebensraum policy.

References

Villages in Płock County
Rawa Voivodeship